Zoë Montana Hoetzel (born September 23, 1994), known professionally as Zolita,  is an American singer-songwriter. She gained viral success with the music video for "Explosion", which has over sixteen million views on YouTube as of December 2020. Following its success, she released the music videos for the singles "Holy" (2016) and "Fight Like a Girl" (2017) directed by herself. On October 13, 2015, she released independently her debut extended play Immaculate Conception, and on May 18, 2018, she released her second extended play Sappho.

Early life and career
Zolita was born on September 23, 1994, in New York to Heidi Schwarck and Holger Hoetzel, and was raised in Calabasas, California. Her father is of German descent, and her mother is of Danish descent. Her father inspired her to start making music and she grew up playing bluegrass and flat pick guitar. She has a brother, Max, a basketball player, and a sister, Luna, a YouTuber and ballerina. She and her siblings all share the middle name Montana.

She started her career with the music video for "Explosion" which gained viral success, it was also listed on Billboards list of "30 Lesbian Love Songs". She further released the second video for the single "Holy", the concept is exploring themes of female sexuality, spirituality, and feminism. On October 13, 2015, she released her debut extended play Immaculate Conception. In 2017 she released the first single from her second extended play Sappho titled "Fight Like a Girl", which is a protest song with feminist themes inspired by the 2016 presidential campaign of Donald Trump. On October 26, 2017, she released "Come Home with Me" as the second single, and on May 4, 2018, she released "New You" as the third single from her second extended play Sappho which was released on May 18 of that year. On December 5, 2018, she released "Truth Tea" along with a music video as the lead single from her debut album, Evil Angel. On March 8, 2019, she released "Black Magic" along with a visual video, however, the song wasn't included on the final tracklist of her debut album. On June 28, 2019, she released "Shut Up and Cry" along with a lyric video as the second single from Evil Angel. On February 14, 2020, she released a cover of Usher's song "U Remind Me" with a music video. On August 7, 2020, she released "Oblivion" along with a music video as the third single from Evil Angel. On September 25 of the same year she released "Bedspell" as the fourth single from the album, and on November 20 she premiered the music video on the online magazine's website Them. The promotional single, "Loveline" was released a week before the album's release, and on December 4, 2020, her debut studio album, Evil Angel, was released. She released music videos for "Somebody I Fucked Once," "Single In September," and "I Fucking Love You" as a trilogy. Her love interest is played by Tatchi Rigsby. Zolita's close friend Shannon Beveridge was the creative director for the latter of the two videos. Within the first week "Somebody I Fucked Once," had 5 million views, and as of July 2022, it has over 44 million views.

Artistry
Zolita's music has been described as "a blend of dark-pop and R&B". Her musical style incorporates witchcraft and religion. She says that religious and witchcraft magic aesthetics are a huge part of her life saying "I feel like queer people are so drawn to Wicca and witchcraft because it's always been the alternative religion, it puts the power in yourself, and it's not historically been a religion that doesn't like queer people." She also cites Lady Gaga as her biggest influence.

Personal life
Zolita identifies as lesbian. In a 2017 interview, she stated that she was afraid to come out to her female friends, saying "I was also worried that my female friends would no longer want to have girls' nights or sleepovers for fear that I might be attracted to them. So, I decided to keep my newfound queerness a secret." She also identifies herself as a Witch; she explains this in videos on her YouTube channel, but also in her music videos where witchcraft is incorporated.

Discography

Studio albums

Extended plays

Singles

Promotional singles

References

External links
 

1994 births
21st-century American singers
American people of German descent
American people of Danish descent
American lesbian musicians
American LGBT singers
Singers from California
Feminist musicians
Living people
American music video directors
21st-century American women musicians
Female music video directors
American pop guitarists
American pop pianists
LGBT people from New York (state)
21st-century women pianists